Saeid Ghomi; is an Iranian football forward who plays for Saba Qom in the Iran Pro League.

Club career
Ghomi was part of Naft Tehran Academy from summer 2014. He promoted to first team in winter 2015 but failed in making any appearances. In summer 2015 he joined to Saba Qom. he made his professional debut for Saba Qom in 1-0 win against Sepahan On September 26, 2015 as a substitute for Jalaleddin Alimohammadi.

Club career statistics

References

External links
 Saeid Ghomi at IranLeague.ir

1994 births
Living people
People from Tehran
Iranian footballers
Association football forwards
Saba players